Talk or Walk is an American one-hour daytime talk show/ relationship show recorded in Los Angeles, California which aired daily on television between late 2001 and January of 2002 when it went out of syndication following the November 2001 ratings sweep— only one season was ever recorded, and through the week ending November 18 it earned only a 0.7 national household rating, well within the typical cancellation territory of the four major American television networks. The show was hosted by Michael Baisden, directed by Barry Glazer, produced by Scott Sternberg, and distributed by Tribune Entertainment.

Under themes such as, "Is This Marriage on the Rocks?", the premise of the program was that two people who had been in a relationship were going to decide to continue to "talk" about that relationship or "walk" away from it, with questions asked by the show's host and its studio audience.  At the end of the segment the pre-arranged decision was announced.

References

2000s American television talk shows
2001 American television series debuts
2002 American television series endings
First-run syndicated television programs in the United States
Television series by Tribune Entertainment